Hong Kong Economic Times Holdings Limited also known as HKET Group, is a Hong Kong publisher. Its main product was Hong Kong Economic Times and its website hket.com. The company also publishes book and magazines.

Publications
Apart from HKET, other publications under the printed media segment of the group include:
Sky Post, a free newspaper (Mondays to Fridays)
Launched on 27 July 2011. 
e-zone, a mass market IT magazine (Mondays) (For retail sale)
A mass market IT weekly magazine that focuses on trends in information and communications technology. It features application of PC hardware and software, tablet and smartphones how-to, digital AV products highlights and analysis on corporate IT strategies.
e-zone was spun off from HKET for total retail sale in late 2003. 
U Magazine – A weekly travel magazine.
iMoney, a financial retail weekly (Saturdays) (For retail sale)
iMoney was a financial weekly launched on 27 October 2007. Its contents focus on wealth management, together with innovative business, marketing gimmicks, workplaces, self-enhancement, etc., covering HK and the Mainland China markets.

Book publishing
 ET Press is providing its readers with contents about investment, business and management. In addition, riding on the success of ET Press, WHY Publishing aims at targeting young readers.

Other business segments of HKET Holdings
Apart from Printed Media business segment, HKET Holdings has diversified its business into Financial News Agency, Information and Solutions; Recruitment Advertising and Training; and Lifestyle Portals.

References

External links
 

Companies listed on the Hong Kong Stock Exchange
Magazine publishing companies of Hong Kong
Publishing companies of Hong Kong
Newspaper companies of Hong Kong